Old Republic may refer to

Star Wars
Galactic Republic, also known as the Old Republic, interplanetary state in the Star Wars universe 
Star Wars: The Old Republic, a massively multiplayer online role-playing game based in the Star Wars universe
Star Wars: The Old Republic (comics), a comic book

Places
First Brazilian Republic (1889–1930), Old Republic or República Velha, a period in Brazilian history
Old Republic (Portugal), 1918–1926, an era within the First Portuguese Republic

Facilities and structures
Old Republic Building, Chicago, Illinois, U.S., an office building

Other uses
Old Republic International, U.S. insurance company

See also

 Old Republican (U.S. politics)
 Old (disambiguation)
 Republic (disambiguation)